Don't Go Near the Water is the debut album of American country music artist Sammy Kershaw. Released in 1991 on Mercury Records, the album produced four singles on the Billboard Hot Country Singles & Tracks (now Hot Country Songs) charts: "Cadillac Style", the title track, "Yard Sale", and "Anywhere but Here", which peaked at numbers 3, 12, 17, and 10, respectively. Also included is "What Am I Worth", a song previously recorded by George Jones on his 1957 debut Grand Ole Opry's New Star. Jones's style has been cited as one of Kershaw's primary influences. Don't Go Near the Water is certified platinum in the United States.

Track listing

Personnel
Kenny Bell – acoustic guitar
David Briggs – keyboards
Costo Davis – keyboards
Glen Duncan – fiddle
Sonny Garrish – steel guitar, Dobro
Rob Hajacos – fiddle
John Hughey – steel guitar
Sammy Kershaw – lead vocals
Jerry Kroon – drums
Brent Mason – electric guitar
Danny Parks – acoustic guitar, fiddle
Larry Paxton – bass guitar, keyboards
Billy Sanford – acoustic guitar, electric guitar
Dennis Wilson – background vocals
Curtis Young – background vocals

Chart performance

References

1991 debut albums
Sammy Kershaw albums
Mercury Nashville albums
Albums produced by Norro Wilson
Albums produced by Buddy Cannon